Kraaifontein is a town in the Western Cape province of South Africa. Organisationally and administratively it is included in the City of Cape Town Metropolitan Municipality as a Northern Suburb. The name originated from large number of crows (Kraai in Afrikaans) that nest in the region.

Beginnings
In 1869 sub-division of farm land started in the area. A railway station was formed in 1876 called "Kraaifontein Junction", followed by formal town development in 1877. The first school was established on 20 January 1908. The Dutch Reformed Church was founded in 1948. In the same year Kraaifontein got its own local authority. In 1954 the "Volkskerk van Afrika (Translated- The nation's church of Africa)" was founded with BJE Appollis being the first preacher. On 16 September 1957, it became a municipality under the first mayor, JP Rossouw.

Today
It is located in the Cape Town's northern suburbs and flanks the N1 towards Paarl and Worcester to the east. It comprises several residential areas, namely Windsor Park, Scottsville, Peerless Park, Eikendal, Scottsdene, Bloekombos, Wallacedene, Belmont Park, Bonny Brook, and Uitzicht.
Libraries are funded and owned by the City of Cape Town Metropolitan municipality.  These libraries are Kraaifontein Public Library, Scottsdene Public Library, and Eikendal Public Library. High Schools in the area are Monument Park, Eben Dönges, Bloekombos, Masibambane Secondary School, Simonsberg Primary School  Scottsdene High School, Scottsville High School and Bernadino Heights High School.

Geography
Kraaifontein, encompassing the areas of Bernardino Heights, Scottsdene, Scottsville, Wallacedene, Eikendal and Bloekombos, was once a separate municipality before the restructuring of all South African municipalities during the late 90s. These areas, however, are listed as separate suburbs by the City of Cape Town for planning and statistical purposes. Forming part of the City of Cape Town Metropolitan Municipality, it is located in its Subcouncil 2 Area, Bergdal.

Kraaifontein is located on the north-eastern outskirts of the Cape Metropole (Cape Town metropolitan area) and at the gateway to the Cape Winelands. It is also situated more or less halfway between Cape Town and Paarl, approximately 31 km north-east of Cape Town and 29 km south-west of Paarl along the N1 highway.

The town is bordered by Durbanville in the north-west and Brackenfell in the west.

Suburban Areas
 Belmont Park 
Bernadino Heights
Bloekombos
Bonnie Brae
Bonnie Brook
Buh-Rein Estate
Eikendal
Joostenberg Vlakte 
Klein Begin
Kraaifontein Agricultural Holdings 
Kraaifontein East
Kraaifontein Industrial 
Langeberg Glen
Langeberg Heights
Langeberg Ridge
Peerless Park East
Peerless Park North
Peerless Park West
Scottsdene
Scottsville
Summerville 
Wallacedene 
Windsor Park
Windsor Park Estate
Viking Village
Zoo Park

Transport

Roads
Kraaifontein’s main road is the R101 regional route and its main street is Voortrekker Road, a segment of the R101. The R101 links Kraaifontein to Brackenfell and Bellville in the south-west as Old Paarl Road and to Klapmuts and Paarl in the north-east as Old Paarl Road (The R101 was the main road between Cape Town and Paarl before the construction of the N1 freeway).

The N1 highway is the main freeway cutting through Kraaifontein and runs from Cape Town in the south-east to Paarl in the north-west. Access to Kraaifontein from the N1 can be obtained through the Brighton/Van Riebeeck Road interchange (Exit 32) and the Maroela Road/Lucullus Street interchange (Exit 34).

Kraaifontein has access to several metropolitan routes in the Cape Metropole including the M15 (Brighton Road; Van Riebeeck Road; Botfontein Road) to Durbanville and the M23, the M23 (Bottelary Road) which runs just outside Kraaifontein to Stellenbosch, M25 (Frans Conradie Drive) to Brackenfell and Bellville, M73 (Marlborough Street; Darwin Road) to Brackenfell and Durbanville and the M167 (Maroela Road; Lucullus Street) linking Joostenbergvlakte to Bloekombos.

Coat of arms
The Kraaifontein municipal council assumed a coat of arms, registered it with the Cape Provincial Administration in June 1964, had it granted by the provincial administrator in March 1967, and registered it at the Bureau of Heraldry in September 1969.
The crest was a parson-crow, and the motto Non auro sed virtute. Together the crow (kraai) and the fountains (fonteine) were a pun on the name of the town.

Notable residents
 Adrian Jacobs, rugby union player
 Cheslin Kolbe, rugby union player, 2019 Rugby World Cup winner
 Dann-Jacques Mouton, actor
 Carmen Solomons, model
 Wayde Van Niekerk, track and field sprinter, current world and Olympic record holder, and Olympic champion

References

Populated places in the City of Cape Town